Michel Monty is a Canadian film writer, director, editor and actor mostly for television. His first long feature was A Life Begins (Une vie qui commence), which premiered at the film festival Cinéma du Québec à Paris.

Michel Monty graduated from Conservatoire d’art dramatique de Montréal in 1989 and has taught at the same academy. He also establishing co-founder of Transthéâtre group.

Filmography

Director
2010: A Life Begins (Une vie qui commence)

Editor
2009: Dirty Sax (short) - editing and sound engineer

Actor
1982: Une vie as Frank Jourdan (TV series)
1995: 10-07: L'affaire Zeus as René Dionne(TV series)
1999: Restless Spirits as François Coli (TV movie)
2000: The Hunger (TV series) - in one episode "The Seductress" as Bradley
2001: Fred-dy as François Falardeau (TV series)
2004: 15/Love (TV series) as Henri Dubé in 4 episodes: "Scourge of the Frankenrival", "Midnight Snack Club", "The French Deception" and "Studentia Jockulus"

References

External links

Official website
Facebook site

Year of birth missing (living people)
Living people
Film directors from Quebec
Canadian male film actors
21st-century Canadian screenwriters
21st-century Canadian male writers
Canadian male screenwriters
Canadian screenwriters in French
Canadian male television actors
Male actors from Quebec
Writers from Quebec
French Quebecers